Sir Samuel Henry Egerton Barraclough  (25 October 1871 – 30 August 1958) was an Australian mechanical engineer.

He was appointed CBE (military division) in 1919 having served in the Great War, and a year later was appointed to the civil division as a KBE. He was Professor of Mechanical Engineering at the University of Sydney, 1915–1942 and President of the Australian Institution of Engineers (1935–36).

References
 Profile, adb.anu.edu.au; accessed 22 March 2016.
 ‘BARRACLOUGH, Sir (Samuel) Henry (Egerton)’, Who Was Who, A & C Black, 1920–2008; online edn, Oxford University Press, Dec 2007 accessed 18 Aug 2012

1871 births
1958 deaths
Australian engineers
Knights Commander of the Order of the British Empire
Academic staff of the University of Sydney